Hardin Run is a  long 2nd order tributary to the Ohio River in Hancock County, West Virginia.  This is the only stream of this name in the United States.

Variant names
According to the Geographic Names Information System, it has also been known historically as:
Hardins Run

Course
Hardin Run rises about 3.5 miles southeast of New Manchester, West Virginia, in Hancock County and then flows generally west-southwest to join the Ohio River at New Cumberland.

Watershed
Hardin Run drains  of area, receives about 38.0 in/year of precipitation, has a wetness index of 298.97, and is about 73% forested.

See also
List of rivers of West Virginia

References

Rivers of West Virginia
Rivers of Hancock County, West Virginia
Tributaries of the Ohio River